Medlánky airfield  is a public aerodrome used primarily for recreational activities and ultralight general aviation. The airfield is situated in the north of Brno, a city in Czech Republic that is also home to Brno-Tuřany International Airport to the south. The airfield is named after the Brno city district of Medlánky, where the administrative and maintenance facilities are located, although its actual manoeuvring area is located in the city district of Komín.

References

External links
 Website of Medlánky aeroclub (Czech language)
 Official data in AIP

Airports in the Czech Republic
Transport in Brno
Buildings and structures in the South Moravian Region
1924 establishments in Czechoslovakia
Airports established in 1924
20th-century architecture in the Czech Republic